The Walenmatt (or Walenmattweid) is a mountain of the Jura, located on the border between the Swiss cantons of Bern and Solothurn. It lies between Crémines and Welschenrohr.

References

Mountains of Switzerland
Mountains of the canton of Bern
Mountains of the Jura
Mountains of the canton of Solothurn
One-thousanders of Switzerland
Bern–Solothurn border